George Wilson Perring (August 13, 1884 – August 20, 1960) was a Major League Baseball third baseman who played for five seasons. He played for the Cleveland Naps from 1908 to 1910 and the Kansas City Packers of the Federal League from 1914 to 1915.

Perring was born in Sharon, Wisconsin and died, and is buried, in Beloit, Wisconsin. He attended Beloit College.

External links

1884 births
1960 deaths
Major League Baseball third basemen
Cleveland Naps players
Kansas City Packers players
Baseball players from Wisconsin
People from Sharon, Wisconsin
Beloit Buccaneers baseball players
Omaha Rourkes players
Toledo Mud Hens players
Columbus Senators players
Toledo Iron Men players
Seattle Rainiers players